Milacidae is a family of air-breathing, keeled, land slugs. These are shell-less terrestrial gastropod mollusks in the superfamily Parmacelloidea.

This family has no subfamilies (according to the taxonomy of the Gastropoda by Bouchet & Rocroi, 2005).

Distribution 
The distribution of the Milacidae includes the western Palearctic.

Anatomy
In this family, the number of haploid chromosomes lies between 31 and 35 (according to the values in this table).

Genera
Genera within the family Milacidae include:
 Milax Gray, 1855 - type genus
 Tandonia Lessona & Pollonera, 1882

Cladogram 
The following cladogram shows the phylogenic relationships of this family to the other families in the limacoid clade:

References

Further reading 
 Schileyko A. A. (2003). "Treatise on recent terrestrial pulmonate mollusks. 10. Ariophantidae, Ostracolethaidae, Ryssotidae, Milacidae, Dyakiidae, Staffordiidae, Gastrodontidae, Zonitidae, Daudebardiidae, Parmacellidae". Ruthenica, Supplement 2. 1309-1466.
 Wiktor A. (1987). "Milacidae (Gastropoda, Pulmonata) — systematic monograph". Annales Zoologici, Warszawa 41: 153-319.

External links